Miryam Roper (born 26 June 1982) is a German-born Panamanian judoka. She competed in the Women's 57 kg event at the 2012 Summer Olympics. Since 2017, Roper competes for her father's land Panama. She also competed in the women's 57 kg event at the 2020 Summer Olympics held in Tokyo, Japan.

References

External links
 
 
 
 

1982 births
Living people
German female judoka
Panamanian female judoka
German people of Panamanian descent
People with acquired Panamanian citizenship
Olympic judoka of Germany
Judoka at the 2012 Summer Olympics
Judoka at the 2016 Summer Olympics
Sportspeople from Aachen
European Games silver medalists for Germany
European Games bronze medalists for Germany
European Games medalists in judo
Judoka at the 2015 European Games
Central American Games gold medalists for Panama
Central American Games medalists in judo
Judoka at the 2019 Pan American Games
Pan American Games medalists in judo
Pan American Games bronze medalists for Panama
Medalists at the 2019 Pan American Games
Judoka at the 2020 Summer Olympics
Olympic judoka of Panama